The Bhatnagar–Gross–Krook operator (abbreviated BGK operator) term refers to a collision operator used in the Boltzmann equation and in the lattice Boltzmann method, a computational fluid dynamics technique.  It is given by the following formula:

where   is a local equilibrium value for the population of particles in the direction of link  The term  is a relaxation time, and related to the viscosity.

The operator is named after Prabhu L. Bhatnagar, Eugene P. Gross, and Max Krook, the three scientists who introduced it in a paper in Physical Review in 1954.

References

Statistical mechanics
Computational fluid dynamics